IDNR may refer to:
IDNR-TV, a Canadian television channel
Illinois Department of Natural Resources